The St. Croix's anole (Anolis acutus), also known as the sharp anole, is an arboreal lizard found only in the Saint Croix, U.S. Virgin Islands.

Distribution
This species is endemic to Saint Croix, U.S. Virgin Islands.

Coloration

The typical coloration for a St. Croix's anole ranges from light tan, yellowish-greenish or dark brown. They have brightly yellow to orange colored dewlaps.

See also
List of Anolis lizards

References

External links

A
Lizards of the Caribbean
Endemic fauna of the United States Virgin Islands
Reptiles of the United States Virgin Islands
Reptiles described in 1856
Taxa named by Edward Hallowell (herpetologist)